Magnolia is a town in Kent County, Delaware, United States. It is part of the Dover, Delaware Metropolitan Statistical Area. Recent estimates put the population at around 235, however, the population was 225 at the 2010 census.

History
The area was known as Caroon Manor when it was first founded and the land had been given by the Duke of York. The town of Magnolia was incorporated in 1885 and was named for the Duke of York's favorite tree, the Magnolia. When it was incorporated, the founders chose for the town to have a circular boundary to represent brotherhood. The town of Magnolia retains its original boundaries as the town council has decided against annexation of land to change the boundaries.

The John B. Lindale House, Matthew Lowber House, Gov. George Truitt House, and three archaeological sites are listed on the National Register of Historic Places.

Geography
Magnolia is located at  (39.0712238, –75.4760327).

According to the sign outside the Lindale house on South Main Street, Magnolia's precise location is "the center of the universe around which the world revolves."

Infrastructure

Transportation

Main Street (former U.S. Route 113 Alternate) is the main north-south road through Magnolia, heading north as South State Street toward Dover and south as Clapham Road toward Delaware Route 1 in Little Heaven. Walnut Street is the main east-west road through Magnolia, heading west as Irish Hill Road toward Canterbury and east as Barkers Landing Road to an interchange with DE 1. DART First State provides bus service to Magnolia along Route 303, which runs north to Dover and south to Milford and Georgetown.

Utilities
Delmarva Power, a subsidiary of Exelon, provides electricity to Magnolia. Chesapeake Utilities provides natural gas to the town. The town's Water Department provides water to Magnolia.

Education
Magnolia is located in the Caesar Rodney School District.

J. Ralph McIlvane Early Childhood Center is in Magnolia. Portions are zoned to Allen Frear Elementary School in Rising Sun-Lebanon while others are zoned to Star Hill Elementary School, in an unincorporated area. Both areas in turn are zoned to Postlethwait Middle School, also in Rising Sun-Lebanon. Caesar Rodney High School in Camden is the comprehensive high school for the entire district.

Demographics

At the 2000 census there were 226 people in 86 households, including 57 families, in the town. The racial makeup of the town was 85.40% White, 10.18% African American, 0.44% Native American, 0.44% Asian, 2.21% from other races, and 1.33% from two or more races. Hispanic or Latino of any race were 3.10%.

Of the 86 households 38.4% had children under the age of 18 living with them, 48.8% were married couples living together, 14.0% had a female householder with no husband present, and 32.6% were non-families. 22.1% of households were one person and 5.8% were one person aged 65 or older.  The average household size was 2.63 and the average family size was 3.10.

The age distribution was 31.0% under the age of 18, 7.1% from 18 to 24, 32.3% from 25 to 44, 18.6% from 45 to 64, and 11.1% 65 or older.  The median age was 31 years. For every 100 females, there were 115.2 males.  For every 100 females age 18 and over, there were 100.0 males.

The median household income was $39,917 and the median family income  was $45,000. Males had a median income of $36,250 versus $20,417 for females. The per capita income for the town was $17,001.  About 10.8% of families and 11.0% of the population were below the poverty line, including 7.1% of those under the age of eighteen and 40.6% of those sixty five or over.

Notable person
Duron Harmon (born 1991), American football safety

References

Towns in Kent County, Delaware
Towns in Delaware